Sidney or Sydney Brown may refer to:
Sidney Brown (electrical engineer) (1873–1948), British electrical engineer and inventor
Sidney Brown (footballer), English soccer goalkeeper
Sidney Brown (accordion maker) (1906–1981), Cajun accordion maker
Omen (record producer) (Sidney Brown, born 1976), Harlem music producer
Sydney MacGillvary Brown (1895–1952), American World War I flying ace, author and professor of medieval history
Sydney Brown (sport shooter) (1873–1945), Canadian Olympic sport shooter
Sydney Brown (American football) (born 2000), American football player

See also
Sidney Browne (1850–1941), Matron-in-Chief
Syd Brown (1917–1987), English cricketer active from 1937 to 1955
Syd Brown (boxer) (died 1947), boxer from Jamaica